Batocera laena is a species of flat-faced longhorn beetle in the subfamily Lamiinae of the family Cerambycidae.

Description

Distribution
This species can be found in Australia (Queensland), Papua New Guinea, Moluccas (Key Islands and Aru Islands), New Britain.

Subspecies
 Batocera laena gracilis Kriesche
 Batocera laena laena Thomson, 1858
 Batocera laena maculosa Schwarzer
 Batocera laena sappho Thomson, 1878

References
   Biolib
  Encyclopedia of Life

External links
  Genus Batocera

Batocerini
Beetles described in 1858
Beetles of Australia
Beetles of Oceania